Bernardo is a given name and less frequently an Italian, Portuguese and Spanish surname. Possibly from the Germanic "Bernhard".

Given name

People 
 Bernardo the Japanese (died 1557), early Japanese Christian convert and disciple of Saint Francis Xavier
 Bernardo Accolti (1465–1536), Italian poet
 Bernardo Bellotto (c. 1721/2-1780), Venetian urban landscape painter and printmaker in etching
 Bernardo Bertolucci (born 1940), Italian film director and screenwriter
 Bernardo Buontalenti (c. 1531–1608), Italian stage designer, architect, theatrical designer, military engineer and artist
 Bernardo Clesio (1484–1539), Italian cardinal, bishop, prince, diplomat, humanist and botanist
 Bernardo Corradi (born 1976), Italian footballer
 Bernardo Daddi (c. 1280–1348), Italian Renaissance painter
 Bernardo Domínguez (born 1979), Spanish footballer known as Bernardo
 Bernardo Dovizi (1470–1520), Italian cardinal and comedy writer
 Bernardo Espinosa (born 1989), Colombian footballer
 Bernardo Frizoni (born 1990), Brazilian footballer
 Bernardo Fernandes da Silva (born 1965), Brazilian footballer
 Bernardo Fernandes da Silva Junior (born 1995), Brazilian footballer and son of the previous Bernardo
 Bernardo de Gálvez (1746–1786), Spanish military leader and colonial administrator who aided the United States in the American Revolutionary War
 Bernardo Gandulla, Argentine footballer
 Bernardo Guimarães (1825–1884), Brazilian poet and novelist
 Bernardo Houssay (1887–1971), Argentine physiologist and Nobel Prize laureate
 Bernardo Kuczer, Argentinian composer, music theoretician and architect
 Bernardo Leighton (1909–1995), Chilean politician
 Bernardo di Niccolò Machiavelli (between 1426 and 1429–1500), Doctor of Law and father of Niccolò Machiavelli
 Bernardo Mattarella (1905–1971), Italian politician
 Bernardo de Miera y Pacheco (1713–1785), cartographer and artist in New Spain
 Bernardo Mota (born 1971), Portuguese tennis player
 Bernardo O'Higgins (1778–1842), Chilean independence leader, one of the founders and ruler of Chile
 Bernardo Pasquini (1637–1710), Italian composer and virtuoso keyboard player
 Bernardo Peres da Silva (1775–1844), only native governor of Portuguese India
 Bernardo Putairi (died 1889), last native ruler of Mangareva
 Bernardo Provenzano (born 1933), leader of the Sicilian Mafia
 Bernardo Reyes (1850–1913), Mexican general and state governor
 Bernardo Rezende (born 1959), Brazilian volleyball coach and player
 Bernardo Romeo (born 1977), Argentine footballer
 Bernardo Rossellino (1409–1464), Italian sculptor and architect
 Bernardo Rucellai (1448/49-1514), Italian oligarch, banker, ambassador and man of letters
 Bernardo Samper, Colombian squash player
 Bernardo Saraiva (born 1993), Portuguese tennis player
 Bernardo Segura (born 1970), Mexican race walker
 Bernardo Saracino, American actor
 Bernardo Strozzi (c. 1581–1644), Italian painter
 Bernardo Tolomei (1272–1348), Italian saint, theologian and founder of the Roman Catholic Congregation of the Blessed Virgin of Monte Oliveto
 Bernardo Trujillo (1920–1971), Colombian-born American marketing executive
 Bernardo Vieira de Souza (born 1990), Brazilian footballer better known as Bernardo
 Bernardo Yorba (1800–1858), American rancher

Fictional characters 
 Bernardo, from William Shakespeare's play Hamlet
 Bernardo, Zorro's deaf-mute servant
 Bernardo, the leader of the Sharks in West Side Story
 Bernardo O'Reilly in The Magnificent Seven
 Bernardo de la Paz in The Moon is a Harsh Mistress

Mythical people 
 Bernardo del Carpio, a mythical Spanish medieval hero.

Surname 
 José-Miguel Bernardo, Spanish statistician
 Joseph Bernardo (born 1929), French swimmer
 Kathryn Bernardo (born 1996), Filipina actress
 Mariano Bernardo (born 1988), Brazilian footballer
 Mike Bernardo (1969–2012), South African kickboxer and boxer
 Noah Bernardo (born 1972), drummer and a founding member of the San Diego-based band P.O.D.
 Paul Bernardo (born 1964), Canadian serial killer and rapist
 Samantha Bernardo (born 1992), Filipina beauty pageant titleholder, Binibining Pilipinas Grand International 2020, and 1st runner up Miss Grand International 2020

Places 
 Bernardo, Texas

See also 
Bernard, a given name
Bernardakis (surname list)
Bernardi (surname list)
Bernardino (disambiguation)
FitzBernard

References 

Italian masculine given names
Portuguese masculine given names
Spanish masculine given names